The 1973 Coliseum Mall International – Singles was an event of the 1973 Coliseum Mall International men's tennis tournament that was played at the Hampton Roads Coliseum in Hampton, Virginia in the United States from February 26 through March 3, 1973. Stan Smith was the defending champion, but did not compete in this edition. Second-seeded Jimmy Connors won the singles title, defeating Ilie Năstase 4–6, 6–3, 7–5, 6–3 in the final.

Seeds

Draw

Finals

Top half

Bottom half

References

External links
 ITF tournament edition details

Tennis in Virginia